New Liberalism is a political party in Colombia. Originally founded by Luis Carlos Galán in 1979 as a dissident force of the Colombian Liberal Party and dissolved in the 1990s, the party was refounded in 2021 by two of his sons, Juan Manuel Galán Pachón and Carlos Fernando Galán.

Running against both the conservatives and the mainstream Liberal Party, Galán lost the elections in 1982. He and his movement officially returned to the Liberal Party in 1987, but several of the members still considered themselves as part of a somewhat distinct entity. Back in the Liberal fold, Luis Carlos Galán appeared as the leading candidate in polls and hoped to be able to win the next presidential elections which would be held in 1990.

After Galán's assassination in 1989, any remnants of the original party had dissolved by the 1990s. At the legislative elections on 10 March 2002, the party won as one of the many small parties parliamentary representation. 

Colombia 1979
Political parties established in 1979
1979 establishments in Colombia
Radical parties
Social liberal parties
Liberal parties in Colombia